Tsukui Moe (born 28 March 2000) is a Japanese rugby union player. She plays for Yokogawa Musashino Atlastars, and  Japanese national team. She competed at the 2017 Asia Rugby Women's Championship and the 2017 Rugby World Cup. She was selected in Japan's squad for the 2021 Rugby World Cup in New Zealand.

Life 
She was born in Takasaki City, Gunma Prefecture. She started playing rugby union at the age of 5 under the influence of her older brother, who was a year older than her, and she began attending Takasaki Rugby School. When she was in junior high school, she joined the track and field club.

She went to Tokyo University of Agriculture Second High School where she played with the boys. In the spring of 2016, she spent three months studying abroad in New Zealand, improving her passing accuracy and her judgment as a scrum half.

In September 2016, the head coach of the Japanese national team, Takeshi Arimizu, saw Tsukui's play and selected her. She started the World Cup 2017 Asia-Oceania qualifier against Fiji in December of the same year, making her the youngest debut for Japan at the age of 16 years and 8 months.

She started all five games at the 2017 World Cup as the ninth scrum-half. She became the youngest player in World Cup history, male or female.

References 

Living people
2000 births
Japanese rugby union players
People from Takasaki, Gunma
Sportspeople from Gunma Prefecture

Japanese female international rugby union players